The Wyandot (sometimes formerly referred to as the Huron) are a First Nations/Native American people originally from the area now often referred to as Ontario, Canada, and surrounding areas.

The Wyandot did not have shamans. Their medicine men were called Arendiwane (or Arendi wane, Orendi wane).

According to Wyandot mythology, Iosheka created the first man and woman and taught them many skills, including all their religious ceremonies and rituals, the ability to fight evil spirits, healing, and the use of the sacrament of tobacco.

See also
 Iroquois mythology

Native American religion
First Nations culture
Religion